Ficus trichocarpa is a climbing fig species, in the family Moraceae, which can be found in Bangladesh, Indo-China and Malesia.  In Vietnam it may be called sung tà.

No subspecies are listed in the Catalogue of Life.  The form previously named F. trichocarpa f. glabrescens Engl. is a synonym of Ficus racemosa L.

References

External links 
 
 

trichocarpa
Flora of Indo-China
Flora of Malesia